Erdem is a masculine name with Uyghur language origin. In 11th century- Qutadghubilik it means "virtue, merit, kind, knowledge".

Erdem may also refer to:

People with the given name
 Erdem Başçı, Turkish economist
 Erdem Helvacıoğlu, Turkish musician
 Erdem Moralioğlu, Turkish-Canadian fashion designer
 Erdem Özgenç, Turkish footballer
 Erdem Türetken, Turkish basketball player
 Erdem Erkul, Turkish Executive and Entrepreneur

People with the surname
 Alparslan Erdem (born 1988), Turkish-German footballer
 Arif Erdem (born 1972), Turkish footballer
 Bülent Erdem (born 1948), Turkish fencer
 Can Erdem (born 1987), Turkish footballer
 Kaya Erdem (born 1928), Turkish politician
 Mülayim Erdem (born 1987), Turkish footballer
 Naci Erdem (1931–2022), Turkish footballer
 Nazim Erdem (born 1970), Australian rugby union player
 Reha Erdem (born 1960), Turkish film director and screenwriter
 Sinan Erdem (1927-2003), Turkish volleyball player
 Talha Ahmet Erdem, Turkish judoka with Down syndrome
 Yonca Şevval Erdem (born 1996), Turkish female water polo player
 Zeynel Abidin Erdem (born 1944), Turkish business tycoon

Turkish-language surnames
Turkish masculine given names